The Bell X-5 was the first aircraft capable of changing the sweep of its wings in flight. It was inspired by the untested wartime P.1101 design of the German Messerschmitt company. In contrast with the German design, which could only have its wing sweepback angle adjusted on the ground, the Bell engineers devised a system of electric motors to adjust the sweep in flight.

Design and development
The incomplete Messerschmitt P.1101 fighter prototype recovered by United States troops in 1945 from the experimental facility at Oberammergau, Germany, was brought back to the United States. Although damaged in transit, the innovative fighter prototype was delivered to the Bell factory at Buffalo, New York where company engineering staff studied the design closely, and, led by Chief Designer Robert J. Woods, submitted a proposal for a similar design.

Although superficially similar, the X-5 was much more complex than the P.1101, with three sweep positions: 20°, 40° and 60°, creating an inflight "variable-geometry" platform. A jackscrew assembly moved the wing's hinge along a set of short horizontal rails, using disc brakes to lock the wing into its inflight positions. Moving from full extension to full sweep took less than 30 seconds. The articulation of the hinge and pivots partly compensated for the shifts in center of gravity and center of pressure as the wings moved.

Even so, the X-5 had vicious spin characteristics arising from the aircraft's flawed aerodynamic layout, particularly a poorly positioned tail and vertical stabilizer which, in some wing positions, could lead to an irrecoverable spin. This violent stall / spin instability would eventually cause the destruction of the second aircraft and the death of its Air Force test pilot in 1953.

The unfavorable spin characteristics also led to the cancellation of tentative plans by the United States Air Force to modify the X-5's design into a low-cost tactical fighter for NATO and other foreign countries.

Operational history
Two X-5s were built (serial numbers 50-1838 and 50-1839). The first was completed 15 February 1951, and the two aircraft made their first flights on 20 June and 10 December 1951. One aircraft was lost on 14 October 1953, when it failed to recover from a spin at 60° sweepback. Air Force Captain Ray Popson died in the crash at Edwards Air Force Base. The other X-5 remained at Edwards and continued active testing  until 1955, and remained in service as a chase plane until 1958.

The X-5 successfully demonstrated the advantage of a swing-wing design for aircraft intended to fly at a wide range of speeds. Despite the X-5's stability problems, the concept was developed to an outboard rather than inboard hinge, and was later successfully implemented in such aircraft as the General Dynamics F-111 and Grumman F-14 Tomcat, the Mikoyan Gurevich MiG-23 and MiG-27, the Sukhoi Su-17/20/22 and Su-24, the Tupolev Tu-22M and Tu-160, the Panavia Tornado and the Rockwell B-1 Lancer.

Survivors
The sole surviving X-5 is now at the National Museum of the United States Air Force at Wright-Patterson Air Force Base near Dayton, Ohio. It was delivered to the museum in March 1958. It is displayed in the museum's Research & Development Hangar.

Specifications (Bell X-5)

See also

References
Notes

Bibliography

 Hallion, Richard P. On The Frontier: Flight Research At Dryden 1946–1981 (NASA SP4303). Washington, DC: National Aeronautics and Space Administration, 1984 (revised 2003 in Smithsonian edition). .
 Winchester, Jim. "Bell X-5." Concept Aircraft: Prototypes, X-Planes and Experimental Aircraft. Kent, UK: Grange Books plc., 2005. .

External links

  American X-Vehicles: An Inventory X-1 to X-50, SP-2000-4531 – June 2003; NASA online PDF Monograph
 

Edwards Air Force Base
Variable-sweep-wing aircraft
X-05, Bell
Single-engined jet aircraft
X-5
Mid-wing aircraft
Aircraft first flown in 1951